The Sededema (Sededeme) is a river in Sakha Republic, Russia. It is a left tributary of the Kolyma.

See also
List of rivers of Russia

References

Rivers of the Sakha Republic